The 1943 Ohio State Buckeyes football team represented Ohio State University in the 1943 Big Ten Conference football season. The Buckeyes compiled a 3–6 record being outscored 149–187. Head coach Paul Brown finished his three-year tenure with an 18–8–1 overall record and a 1–1–1 mark against Michigan.

Schedule

Coaching staff
 Paul Brown, head coach, third year

1944 NFL draftees

References

Ohio State
Ohio State Buckeyes football seasons
Ohio State Buckeyes football